The 2013 Winter Universiade, the XXVI Winter Universiade, was a winter multi-sport event which took place in Trentino, Italy between 11 and 21 December 2013.

This was the first time that a Winter Universiade happened after the Summer Universiade in same the year and in the end of the year and missing two months for the  2014 Winter Olympic Games. Originally, it was planned to take place in Maribor, Slovenia in late January and early February, but the Government of Slovenia overturned its decision to partially fund the project due to financial problems in February 2012. In March 2012, the International University Sports Federation decided that it would organise the Universiade elsewhere. FISU officially announced that the Trentino region of Italy would host the event.

The motto of the event was "Inspired by U". The torch, made by the Department of Industrial Engineering of the University of Trento, recalled a flower of gentian with five petals in the shape of a ski, with colors that recall the Olympic colors and the five stars of the universes. It was officially lit by Pope Francis in Rome on 6 November 2013.

Bid selection
The city of Maribor (Slovenia) was the only one bidding city for the event. On May 31, 2008, Maribor won the right to host the event, but later withdrew.

After the FISU revoked the rights of Maribor, they began secret negotiations with the region of Trentino that, for financial reasons, had withdrawn their bid to host the 2017 Winter Universiade. Two weeks after the resignation of Maribor, negotiations were completed and Trentino was formalized as the new host region. The factor that gave a boom for the negotiations was the fact that their infrastructure was ready and did not need improvement works.Some of venues will be used during the 2026 Winter Olympics.

Venues
The following venues have been named to host the various events at the 2013 Winter Universiade:

Baselga di Piné

Monte Bondone

Pergine Valsugana

Trento

Val di Fassa

Val di Fiemme

Sports
The numbers in parentheses indicate the number of medal events contested in each sport. The two optional sports chosen for the 2013 Winter Universiade were freestyle skiing and speed skating.

Participants
Following is a list of nations that entered athletes at the Universiade:

 
 
 
 
 
 
 
 
 
 
 
 
 
 
 
 
 
 
 
 
 
 
  (host)

Medal table

Schedule
The competition schedule for the 2013 Winter Universiade is shown as follows:

References

External links
 
 Result Book

 
2013
Universiade Winter
2013 in Italian sport
Sport in Trentino
International sports competitions hosted by Italy
Multi-sport events in Italy
December 2013 sports events in Italy
Winter sports competitions in Italy